Trinity is the debut studio album by American progressive metal band Prototype. The album was released on February 12, 2002 via WWIII Music/AMC. The album was also released in Europe via Massacre Records; this version featured two bonus tracks that were not on the American version and were later included on the digital re-release.

Track listing 
All tracks written by Vince Levalois and Kragen Lum.

Personnel 
Credits are adapted from the album's liner notes.

Prototype
 Vince Levalois – vocals, guitar
 Kragen Lum – guitar
 Kirk Scherer – bass
 Pat Magrath – drums

Production
 Prototype – producers
 Eddy Schreyer – mastering

Artwork
 Travis Smith – artwork, package design and layout (with band)
 Alex Solca – band photography

References

External links 
 

2002 albums
Prototype (band) albums
Albums with cover art by Travis Smith (artist)